Chris Van den Durpel (born 7 October 1960) is a Belgian impressionist and actor. He is also famous as an imitator of famous Flemish and Dutch people.

Filmography
1997: Osje
2002: Ice Age (Flemish dub)
2005: Robots (Flemish dub)
2006: Ice Age: The Meltdown (Flemish dub)
2007: Firmin
2007: The Simpsons Movie (Flemish dub)
2009: Ice Age: Dawn of the Dinosaurs (Flemish dub)
2012: K3 Bengeltjes
2013: Marina
2015: Mega Mindy versus Rox
2017: Het tweede gelaat

Television
1994: Buiten De Zone
1997: Schalkse Ruiters
1998–2004: Chris & Co
2011–2015: ROX
2014: Celebrity Family Feud
2017: Allemaal Chris

Theatre
2001–2002: Kuifje – De Zonnetempel
2008–2009: Daens
2013: Shrek The Musical

References

External links
 

1960 births
Living people
Belgian male film actors
Flemish male film actors
Belgian stand-up comedians
Belgian stage actors
Belgian humorists
Belgian parodists
Impressionists (entertainers)
People from Lokeren